Roucheria is a genus of flowering plants belonging to the family Linaceae.

Its native range is Nicaragua to southern Tropical America. It is found in Bolivia, Brazil (northern, north-eastern and west-central), Colombia, Ecuador, French Guiana, Guyana, Nicaragua, Peru, Suriname and Venezuela.
  
The genus name of Roucheria is in honour of Jean-Antoine Roucher (1745–1794), a French poet. It was first described and published in London J. Bot. Vol.6 on page 141 in 1847.

Known species
According to Kew:
Roucheria calophylla 
Roucheria columbiana 
Roucheria elata 
Roucheria laxiflora 
Roucheria monsalveae 
Roucheria schomburgkii 
Roucheria sipapoensis

References

Linaceae
Malpighiales genera
Plants described in 1847
Flora of Nicaragua
Flora of northern South America
Flora of western South America
Flora of North Brazil
Flora of Northeast Brazil
Flora of West-Central Brazil